Lorna Watson (born 1977) is a British comedian, actress and television presenter.

She was one of the presenters of Spy School. Her acting roles include various characters in television sketch shows Rush Hour, The Wrong Door and Watson & Oliver with comedy partner Ingrid Oliver. The two met at Tiffin Girls' School in Kingston upon Thames. She also played a one-off character called 'Thingy' in the 'fashion phonies' episode of CBBC's Hotel Trubble. Her influences are French & Saunders and Fry & Laurie. In March 2012 she appeared on Let's Dance for Sport Relief with Ingrid Oliver; they danced to Ravel's Boléro.

In 2013 she appeared as Sister Boniface in the Father Brown episode "The Bride of Christ" and took part in a special series of The Great British Bake Off.

In 2015, she starred in a special episode of Horrible Histories in which she played Boudicca.

In January 2020, it was announced that Lorna would be reprising her Sister Boniface role for a new series called Sister Boniface Mysteries, with a ten-episode first series premiering on the streaming service BritBox.

References

External links
 

1977 births
21st-century British actresses
British television actresses
British television presenters
British television writers
British women comedians
British women writers
People educated at the Tiffin Girls' School
Date of birth missing (living people)
Place of birth missing (living people)
Living people
British women television writers
British women television presenters
21st-century British comedians